Darren T. Holmes is a film editor whose credits include animated films such as The Iron Giant (1999), Lilo & Stitch (2002), Ratatouille (2007), How to Train Your Dragon (2010), and The Croods (2013) as well as My Father’s Dragon (2022). He also served as a consulting editor for Song of the Sea (2014).

Holmes has been elected to membership in the American Cinema Editors.

Holmes is also a member of the Academy of Motion Picture Arts and Sciences.

Filmography
 The Iron Giant (1999)
 Lilo & Stitch (2002)
 Ratatouille (2007)
 How to Train Your Dragon (2010) - with Maryann Brandon
 The Croods (2013) - with Eric Dapkewicz
 Song of the Sea (2014) - Consulting editor
 My Father’s Dragon (2022) - with Richie Cody
 Puss in Boots: The Last Wish (2022) - Pre-production editor
 Ray Gunn (TBA)

References

External links

American film editors
American Cinema Editors
Living people
Pixar people
Cartoon Saloon people
DreamWorks Animation people
Skydance Media people
Walt Disney Animation Studios people
Year of birth missing (living people)
Place of birth missing (living people)